Heaven's Lost Property is an anime series adapted from the manga of the same name by Suu Minazuki. The story revolves around Tomoki Sakurai, a young man struggling for a life of peace and quiet when he encounters Ikaros, an Angeloid who fell from the sky, and other Angeloids as the series progresses.

Produced by Anime International Company and directed by Hisashi Saito, the anime was broadcast on TV Saitama and Chiba TV from October 4 to December 27, 2009, with subsequent broadcasts on KBS Kyoto, TV Kanagawa, Sun Television, TVQ, Tokyo MX and TV Aichi. English-subtitled simulcasts were provided by Crunchyroll on their video portal. Seven DVD compilation volumes were released between December 25, 2009 and June 25, 2010 by Kadokawa Pictures, with limited edition volumes also sold. A Blu-ray box set was released on June 24, 2011. The anime is licensed in North America by Funimation as Heaven's Lost Property: Sora no Otoshimono, and released the first season on December 20, 2011. Heaven's Lost Property covers events up to the Nymph/Harpies storyline of the manga, with most of the stories resequenced to fit the themes of the episodes, for instance, the visit to Mikako Satsukitane's place is coupled with the island vacation trip. Both Mikako and Nymph are introduced earlier in the series so they participate in more of the events.

An OVA episode entitled "Project Pink" was bundled with the Limited Edition release of volume 9 of the manga on DVD on September 9, 2010. The episode was considered "too dangerous" for TV and was originally planned to be on the seventh DVD volume, but was later removed and replaced with a TV version of the final episode and live footage of the SoraOto live concert which took place on March 20, 2010.

A second season, titled , was announced on reprinted copies of the manga. Also produced by A.I.C., the anime aired 12 episodes on TV Saitama and Chiba TV from October 1 to December 17, 2010, with simulcasts provided by Crunchyroll as with the first season. Six DVD volumes were released by Kadokawa Pictures between December 24, 2010 and May 27, 2011. The second season is licensed by Funimation under the title Heaven's Lost Property: Sora no Otoshimono Forte, and has streamed simulcasts on their video portal. Forte resumes where the previous season has left off, covering events from the Astraea arc to the Chaos arc of the manga while leaving the Hiyori arc to be featured in the follow-up film Heaven's Lost Property the Movie: The Angeloid of Clockwork. As with the first season, many of the manga's events are resequenced to fit the themes of the episodes.

The opening theme for the first season is "Ring My Bell" by Blue Drops, consisting of singers Hitomi Yoshida and Ikaros (Saori Hayami), while multiple ending themes were used for each episode aired. As with the first season, each episode features a different ending song.

Episode list

Heaven's Lost Property (2009)

Heaven's Lost Property: Forte (2010)

Notes

References

External links
Official Sora no Otoshimono anime website 
Heaven’s Lost Property – The Official Anime Website from Funimation

Heaven's Lost Property